Liu Yun (born December 26, 1982) is a Chinese actress.

Biography
Liu Yun was raised in Changsha, Hunan, China; and later became a graduate from Central Academy of Drama. Liu later played several leading roles in TV serials and films like The Prince of Han Dynasty, [[Royal Tramp (TV series)|Royal Tramp]] and One Plum Blossom''.

Personal life
On May 26, 2010, Liu married famous Chinese rock star Zheng Jun, and gave birth to their baby boy Zheng Xingfu, in Los Angeles, U.S., on October 23, 2010.

Filmography

Film

Television series

Variety show

References

Living people
Actresses from Changsha
Chinese film actresses
Chinese television actresses
Participants in Chinese reality television series
1983 births
Central Academy of Drama alumni
21st-century Chinese actresses
The Amazing Race contestants